William K. Williams (May 21, 1943 – May 12, 2019) was an American Tlingit politician and businessman.

Williams was born in Ketchikan, Alaska. He graduated from Ketchikan High School in 1962, before becoming a longshoreman. He was on the Saxman, Alaska City Council and served as Mayor of Saxman from 1976 to 1983. He served in the Alaska House of Representatives from 1993 to 2004 and was a Democrat. In 1998, he switched to the Republican Party. Williams died in Ketchikan, Alaska.

References

1943 births
2019 deaths
20th-century Native Americans
21st-century Native Americans
Alaska Democrats
Alaska Republicans
Alaska city council members
Businesspeople from Alaska
Mayors of places in Alaska
Members of the Alaska House of Representatives
Native American state legislators in Alaska
People from Ketchikan, Alaska
Tlingit people
20th-century American businesspeople